Hube Rural LLG is a local-level government (LLG) of Morobe Province, Papua New Guinea.

Wards
17. Pindiu Station
18. Tireng
19. Unsesu
20. Gemaheng
21. Sembang (Sofifi)
22. Sanangac
23. Zaningu
24. Homoneng
25. Morago
26. Besibong
27. Pindiu Station
28. Zenguru
29. Qwakugu
30. Genna
31. Gaeng
32. Sofifi

References

Local-level governments of Morobe Province